Kitwanga  or Gitwangak or Gitwangax ("people of the place of rabbits" in the Gitxsan language) is located where the Kitwanga River runs into the Skeena River in British Columbia. A long-standing village before contact, the village is within Gitwangak Indian Reserve No. 1.

There is recreational salmon fishing (chinook, coho, pink, sockeye and steelhead). The community is governed by a local band office. As of the current census the population of Kitwanga is approximately 480 and is primarily a small town made up of patriarchal families like the Ranahans Harris, fallers Faulkners Daniels and the Spooners.

National Historic Site of Canada
The totem poles of Gitwangak village are a National Historic Site of Canada, as is nearby Kitwanga Fort.

The Gitxsan Nation is made up of:
Kitwanga (Gitwangak)
Kispiox (Anspayax)
Glen Vowell (Sik i dak)
Old Hazelton (Gitanmaax)
 Gitsegukla, also spelled Kitseguecla or Kitsegukla
Cedarvale (Meanskaniist or Minskinish,).
'Ksan (living museum/historical village)

Notable residents
Judith P. Morgan, painter

See also
Gitwangak Battle Hill National Historic Site
Kitwanga Mountain Provincial Park
Kitwanga railway station
Kispiox
Hazelton
Tsimshian
Nisga'a

References
BC Names/GeoBC listing "Kitwanga (community)"

External links
 
 Google Map photo of Kitwanga

Unincorporated settlements in British Columbia
Populated places in the Regional District of Kitimat–Stikine
Skeena Country
Gitxsan